Lieutenant General Hattingh Pretorius  (1942–2008) was a South African military commander, who held the post of Chief of the South African Army November 1, 1993December 31, 1994.

Awards and decorations

See also

List of South African military chiefs
South African Army

References

1942 births
2008 deaths
Afrikaner people
South African military personnel of the Border War
Chiefs of the South African Army